Royal Air Force Sullom Voe or more simply RAF Sullom Voe is a former Royal Air Force station near the village of Brae, in the Shetland Isles of Scotland.  It was a Flying boat base and was closely associated with the adjacent airfield of RAF Scatsta.

History

Beginnings

The building of this flying boat station started well before the Second World War during 1938 and it became home to various Coastal Command squadrons that patrolled the North Sea, Norwegian Sea and North Atlantic for enemy ships and U-boats. In the early days accommodation was provided by the Clyde-built SS Manella, a ship built in 1921, requisitioned by the Royal Navy in 1939, renamed HMS Manella and sent to Sullom Voe as a supply ship to provide temporary accommodation prior to suitable accommodation being built on-shore at nearby Graven.  201 Squadron was posted there just 25 days before the declaration of war on 3 September 1939.  240 Squadron was posted there a month later on 4 November 1939 then Sullom Voe became the first location in the British Isles to be bombed on Monday 13 November 1939 when four bombs landed in a field.  No damage was formally reported apart from the death of a rabbit!

The complex was added to when a nearby airfield was built during 1940 and named RAF Scatsta.

Units

The following units were also here at some point:
 No. 2733 Squadron RAF Regiment
 No. 2751 Squadron RAF Regiment
 No. 2766 Squadron RAF Regiment
 No. 2778 Squadron RAF Regiment
 No. 2782 Squadron RAF Regiment

During the War

In 1944 one of 210 Sqn's pilots, Flying Officer John Cruickshank, carried out a successful attack off Narvik on a German U-boat, sinking the U-361, which by this time possessed heavy anti-aircraft guns. Despite severe injuries from those guns, he managed to fly his aircraft home and circled until daybreak before he was able to land it safely saving his crew, an achievement for which he was awarded the Victoria Cross.

Post War

After the Second World War: See Sullom Voe, Sullom Voe Terminal and Scatsta Airport.

References

Citations

Bibliography

 Seymour, Mike and Bill Balderson. To The Ends of the Earth: 210 Squadron's Catalina Years, 1941–1945. Pembroke Dock, Pembrokeshire, UK: Paterchurch Publications, 1999. .

Royal Air Force stations in Scotland
Airports established in 1938
1945 disestablishments
Sullom Voe